Matthew Jones (born April 22, 1983) is a former American football wide receiver and former sports radio personality. He was drafted by the Jacksonville Jaguars in the first round of the 2005 NFL Draft, and also played for the Cincinnati Bengals. He played college football at Arkansas.

Early years
Matt Jones was born to Steve and Paula Jones on April 22, 1983, in Dermott, Arkansas. He spent most of his childhood in Van Buren, Arkansas, where his parents taught school and his father coached football and track. He attended Van Buren Public Schools from grade school through the end of his junior year. He burst onto the high school football scene as a  sophomore wide receiver (WR), quickly making an impact for the Pointers football team, leading the team in TD receptions. He helped lead the Pointers to a 5A conference title and was named Super Sophomore by the Arkansas Democrat Gazette. Jones went on to break Corliss Williamson's Arkansas high school basketball scoring record. Jones left Van Buren following his junior year for the opportunity to play quarterback at Northside High School in Fort Smith, Arkansas, as well as be a sprinter on the school track team.

College career
In college, Jones was a star quarterback for the University of Arkansas, and was also a member of the basketball team for one season.
During his football career at Arkansas, Jones was a part-time starter his freshman season in 2001, and was the full-time starter from 2002 to 2004.

In his freshman year, Jones helped Arkansas defeat an Eli Manning-led Ole Miss team in Oxford in an NCAA record-setting seven overtimes. The Razorbacks lost to the University of Oklahoma in the Cotton Bowl, and finished with a record of 7–5.

In his sophomore season, Jones led Arkansas to a share of the SEC West Division championship, with a last-second touchdown pass to receiver Decori Birmingham, in a game against LSU in Little Rock. The game came to be known in the Arkansas–LSU football rivalry as the Miracle on Markham, making reference to War Memorial Stadium's being on Markham Street. Arkansas lost to the University of Minnesota in the 2002 Music City Bowl, and finished 9–5.

His junior year in 2003 was his most eventful, and saw Jones lead the Razorbacks to their second consecutive 9-win season. This included another seven-overtime victory, this time at Kentucky. Jones also led Arkansas to an 2003 Independence Bowl victory over the Missouri Tigers, 27–14, and the Razorbacks finished the season with a 9–4 record. Jones was named Second-team All-Southeastern Conference at the end of the season.

Jones' senior year saw Arkansas fail to reach a bowl game, finishing 5–6.

By the time his playing days at Arkansas were over, Jones was the SEC's all-time leader in career rushing yards by a quarterback. His rushing totals have since been eclipsed by Tim Tebow and Nick Fitzgerald.

Professional career

2005 NFL Draft

Jacksonville Jaguars
Jones, a college quarterback, was selected by the Jacksonville Jaguars as a wide receiver in the first round (21st overall) of the 2005 NFL Draft. This move surprised some draft experts who thought it was a risky selection as Jones had not been a full-time wide receiver at any prior point in his career.

As a rookie, Jones finished 2005 with 36 receptions for 432 yards and five touchdowns. He then finished 2006 with 41 receptions for 643 yards and four touchdowns. In 2007, he saw his production drop. At the beginning of the season, he pledged to not shave his beard until he scored a touchdown. His streak of end zone shutouts ended in Week 8 against the Tampa Bay Buccaneers. He finished the 2007 regular season with 24 receptions for 317 yards and was tied for second on the team with four touchdown catches. In 2008, he had 65 catches for 761 yards in 12 games before being suspended for three games by the NFL on October 20, 2008, for violation of the league's substance abuse policy. He has not played in a regular-season NFL game since.

On March 16, 2009, Jones was released from the Jacksonville Jaguars following substance abuse-related arrests.

Cincinnati Bengals
Jones worked out with several teams during the 2009 season, but none resulted in contracts. After spending the 2009 NFL season out of football, Jones received contract offers from the Cincinnati Bengals and the Tennessee Titans. On February 12, 2010, Jones signed a one-year, $700,000 contract with the Bengals. Jones was waived on the last day of final cuts by the Bengals and did not make the 53-man roster.

On November 2, 2010, it was reported that Jones declined a tryout with the Washington Redskins, telling them that he intended to retire.

NFL career statistics

Radio career
Jones worked as a sports radio personality in Arkansas from 2012 to 2016.

Arrests
On July 10, 2008, in Fayetteville, Arkansas, Jones was arrested at gunpoint and charged with felony possession of a controlled substance.

Jones and one other former Arkansas football player, Jared Hicks, were inside a vehicle that was searched by police. The police found a plastic bag filled with six grams of a white substance that tested positive as cocaine and a jar with possible marijuana residue. Officers questioned Jones and he acknowledged the white powder was in fact cocaine, the report said.

Jones' father, Steve Jones, disputed the allegations that his son was involved in any wrongdoing and released a statement which was posted on the web site of Fayetteville television station KNWA-TV: "We want to make it clear that Matt was not in possession of any drugs, but that there were drugs in the vehicle and were located in the closest proximity to Matt."

On October 8, 2008, an agreement was reached between Jones and the Washington County Prosecutor's Office. Prosecutor John Threet agreed to send the case to drug court on October 13, 2008. Prosecutors said the felony charge would be dismissed if Jones completed the drug program. A hearing in drug court, rather than in the regular criminal system, allowed Jones to keep any conviction off his record.

The NFL suspended Jones for three weeks for violating the league's substance abuse policy. He was in the lineup for Week 8, pending an appeal.
On December 9, 2008, the NFL upheld Jones' three-game suspension, which caused him to miss the rest of the season.

On March 9, 2009, in Washington County, Jones was arrested again after failing a drug test which showed that he had alcohol in his system, which violated the condition of his probation. He was held in jail after he asked to be imprisoned rather than sent to a six-week residential treatment program that would have interfered with the beginning of training camp. He was released on March 14, 2009, after his latest arrest, but returned to court on April 13.

References

External links
 Jacksonville Jaguars bio

1983 births
Living people
American football quarterbacks
American football tight ends
American football wide receivers
American men's basketball players
Arkansas Razorbacks football players
Arkansas Razorbacks men's basketball players
Cincinnati Bengals players
Jacksonville Jaguars players
Sportspeople from Fort Smith, Arkansas
People from Van Buren, Arkansas
Players of American football from Arkansas
Basketball players from Arkansas